The Tokyo Haneda Vickies are a basketball team based in Ota, Tokyo, playing in the Women's Japan Basketball League.

Notable players

Asuka Hiramatsu
Mami Koyama (basketball)
Nako Motohashi
Saori Yoshida

Coaches
Kiyohide Kuwata
Satoru Furuta
Koju Munakata
Mikiko Hagiwara

Venues
 Minatoku Sports Center
Omori Sports Center

References

External links
 Official website

Basketball teams in Japan
Basketball teams established in 1971
1971 establishments in Japan